Bruce Gregory (10 July 1915 – 7 July 1998) was an  Australian rules footballer who played with North Melbourne in the Victorian Football League (VFL).

Notes

External links 

1915 births
1998 deaths
Australian rules footballers from Victoria (Australia)
North Melbourne Football Club players
Coburg Football Club players